igisbalis, meaning "sandy beach at point", was village and halibut-fishing station of the Mamalilikulla group of Kwakwaka'wakw just behind Hoeya Head, on the south side of the opening of Hoeya Sound on Knight Inlet in the Central Coast region of British Columbia, Canada.

See also
List of Kwakwaka'wakw villages

References

Kwakwaka'wakw villages
Central Coast of British Columbia